Hard to Be a God is a 2013 Russian epic medieval science fiction film directed by Aleksei German who co-wrote the screenplay with Svetlana Karmalita. It was his last film and it is based on the 1964 novel of the same name by Arkady and Boris Strugatsky.

A team of scientists travel to the planet Arkanar that is culturally and technologically centuries behind — progress is stuck way back in the Middle Ages. Anybody the inhabitants of the planet consider an intellectual is instantly executed. The scientists are ordered to not interfere and work undercover, but one of them, Rumata, wishes to stop the senseless murders of brilliant minds and is forced to at last pick a side.

Plot 
The entirety of the film takes place on another planet, in the city of Arkanar, in a society that closely resembles the Middle Ages on Earth. History here has gone its own way: no Renaissance has occurred, the little glimpses of science and culture that exist are suppressed and killed off under the influence of a proto-fascist police state; dirt and dullness is everywhere. Around thirty Earthling scientists are sent to the planet incognito, in order to observe the outcome of this society. However, they are barred from influencing the local civilization or interfering with the city's natural course. One of the Earthlings has been living on the planet for twenty years, in a large house filled with his multitudes of slaves and servants. Disguised as a Noble Don named Rumata of Estor, he has become known among some of the townspeople as the son of Goran (a local pagan god). In duels, Rumata does not kill enemies, but only cuts off their ears, as it is forbidden for him to kill. At night, he dreams of murder. He is tasked with saving the intellectuals of this society - bookworms and wisemen, who are constantly persecuted by the so-called Gray troops under the leadership of Don Reba, who has usurped power in the state.

From Muga, his head slave, Rumata learns of a certain tobacco-grower from Tobacco Street who is supposedly one of the clever inhabitants of Arkanar. On rocky islets among the swamps that surround the city, Rumata hides Arkanarian scientists to safety. From time to time, other Earthlings also gather in these swamps, more and more alienated from each other, and constantly drunk (as is Rumata). A doctor named Budakh, who was supposed to be taken to shelter, had disappeared along with his escort. Wanting to find out about his fate, Rumata gets an appointment with the king and Don Reba, but fails. In the saloons, Rumata meets his friend Pampa, a washed-up local baron. After a drunken night, Rumata is suddenly arrested in the palace by Grays and taken to Don Reba for interrogation. Reba informs him that he has become the Master of the Order, a militant religious sect from across the country, and tries to find out if Rumata really is a God or not. Rumata manages to convince Reba of his divine powers, and he is released after being given a bunch of security clearance bracelets.

The black-robed monks of the Order invade the city, seizing power in Arkanar during the night. The king and his family has been killed, and the courtiers are executed publicly. In the morning, Rumata goes to the torture chambers of the Tower of Joy and rescues Budakh and Baron Pampa, the latter of whom happened to end up there. Pampa, trying to escape from the city, is killed by being shot from arrows. Afterwards, Rumata talks with Budakh, trying to figure out what the scientist would advise God on how to fix the state of affairs in the world of Arkanar. Budakh's answer does not satisfy the Earthling: the weak will replace the strong, but this will not stop the constant struggle for power. Rumata and Budakh return home. Rumata's castle had survived an attack during the night, leading to two servants being killed, including Uno, a young troublemaker and Rumata's favorite. Defeated and tired, Rumata meets Arata the Hunchback, a feared revolutionary figure who tries to convince him to lead the slave uprising with his Earthly technology. However, Rumata refuses - time will pass, exploitation and slavery will happen again in a cycle. Having given Arata a protective bracelet of the Order, Rumata orders the servants to drive him away with sticks. The next day, Ari, Rumata's lover on Arkanar, is killed by a crossbow arrow shot through the back of her head. Right then, soldiers of the Order burst into Rumata's house in search of heretics, guided by a certain crippled monk, in whose description it is easy to guess Arata. Furious at the murder of Ari, Rumata informs their leader, a former university student named Arima, that he will kill them all, and soon turns his threat into reality. He kills Arima first. After disemboweling Arima's body, revealing his still-beating heart, Rumata sets off for the city and massacres all in his way.

A group of Earthlings, including the elder Don Condor, make their way through the ruins of Arkanar. They discover mountains of corpses, including the ones of Arata and Don Reba. From the conversation amongst the earthlings, it becomes clear that Ari died from an arrow shot by Arata, wanting to set Rumata off on the monks of the Order, but also being killed himself. Finally, Don Condor and Pashka discover Rumata himself, sitting alone in a puddle in the same pajamas. He refuses the offer to return to Earth. “A God can get tired too,” he says to Condor. Don Condor silently accepts Rumata's decision. Finally, Rumata notes the historical sequence with a grave warning: "Where Grays triumph, Blacks always come in the end." He advises Don Condor what to write in the report on his actions: "Tell him that it is hard to be a god." With this, Don Condor and Pashka leave. Exhausted, Rumata falls asleep.

During the winter, two of the bookworms hiding in the swamps had quarreled and killed each other. Rumata has stayed behind with the land of Arkanar, becoming a part of their world. He is older, graying, sports a new pair of glasses, and sets off in the snowy distance with his various slaves and horsemen. A little girl and her father walk through the snow, meanwhile. The girl asks her father what he thinks of Rumata's saxophone playing, heard as they leave. The father isn't sure what he thinks. "It makes my tummy hurt," the little girl responds. The screen fades from the white landscape to black.

Cast 
 Leonid Yarmolnik – Don Rumata
 Dmitri Vladimirov
 Laura Pitskhelauri
 Aleksandr Ilyin – Arata
 Yuri Tsurilo – Don Pampa
 Yevgeni Gerchakov – Budakh
 Aleksandr Chutko – Don Reba
 Oleg Botin – Bucher
 Pyotr Merkuryev

Production 
Filming began in the autumn of 2000 in the Czech Republic and continued off-and-on for a period of several years, ending in August 2006 at the Lenfilm studios in Saint Petersburg, Russia. During the lengthy editing and post-production stage, German passed away before the film could be completed. Production was concluded by members of his family. The film was premiered at the 2013 Rome Film Festival (out of competition).

The film was reported to have been renamed to The History of the Arkanar Massacre. The press has also mentioned the alternative title The Carnage in Arkanare, and a film script published under the title "What said the tobacconist from Tobacco Street".

Later, the title was reverted to Hard to Be a God.

Reception

Critical response
Reception in the Russian media was mixed.  However, Hard to Be a God received universal acclaim from English-language critics. Review aggregator site Rotten Tomatoes reports that 95% of critics gave the film a positive review, based on 43 reviews with an average rating of 9.03/10. The site's consensus reads: "A sci-fi epic with palpable connections to the present, Hard to Be a God caps director Aleksei German's brilliant filmography with a final masterpiece". Metacritic, which assigns a weighted average score out of 100 to reviews from mainstream critics, reports the film has a score of 90 based on 13 reviews, indicating "universal acclaim".

Peter Bradshaw in The Guardian newspaper gave it five stars out of five, calling it: "awe-inspiring in its own monumentally mad way" and "beautiful, brilliant and bizarre". Ignatiy Vishnevetsky of The A.V. Club likened it to Orson Welles' Chimes at Midnight, naming German as "probably the most important Russian filmmaker to remain more or less completely unknown in the United States." He praised the "grotesque and deranged" medieval sci-fi film as "first and foremost a vision of human misery, brutality, and ignorance."

The location manager and sometimes film blogger Shane Scott-Travis included the film in his list "25 most beautiful films of the 21st century" (ranking it the 17th) in the website of film bloggers Taste of Cinema.

Best lists
Hard to Be a God was listed by numerous critics' and publications' as one of the top films of 2015.

 1st – Glenn Kenny, Some Came Running
 3rd – Ignatiy Vishnevetsky, The A.V. Club
 3rd – Kevin B. Lee, Fandor
 4th – J. Hoberman, Artforum
 4th – M. Leary
 6th – Nick Schager, The A.V. Club
 6th – Reverse Shot
 6th – Slant
 6th – Ben Sachs, The Chicago Reader
 10th – Fandor
 11th - Film Comment
 Top 12 (unranked)- Dennis Cooper
 13th - Adam Nayman, The A.V. Club
 13th - The A.V. Club
 25th - Paste
 Top 66 (unranked)- IndieWire

Hard to Be a God has also been considered one of the top films of the 2010s. 

 Top 15 (unranked)- Glen Kenny, Some Came Running
 20th - Ben Sachs, The Chicago Reader
 23rd - Jordan Cronk

They Shoot Pictures, Don't They? determines Hard to Be a God as the 228th-most critically-acclaimed film of the 21st century.

See also 
 List of films shot over three or more years

References

Further reading

External links
 
 
  18 frames of the film (black and white)
  A fragment of the director's screenplay
 The Village Voice review 
 Electric Sheep review

2013 films
Films based on works by Arkady and Boris Strugatsky
Czech science fiction films
Russian science fiction films
Russian dystopian films
Films based on science fiction novels
2010s Russian-language films
Films directed by Aleksei Yuryevich German
Lenfilm films
2013 science fiction films
Films based on Russian novels
Russian black-and-white films
Czech black-and-white films